Koodathai  is a village in Kozhikode district in the state of Kerala, India. The village is best known for the Koodathayi cyanide murders.

Demographics
 India census, Koodathai had a population of 12,919, with 6,382 males and 6,537 females.

Transportation
Koodathayi village connects to other parts of India through Calicut city on the west and Thamarassery town on the east. National Highway 66 (old NH-17) passes through Calicut and the northern stretch connects to Mangalore, Goa, and Mumbai.  The southern stretch connects to Cochin and Trivandrum.  The eastern National Highway No.54 going through Adivaram connects to Kalpetta, Mysore, and Bangalore. The nearest airports are at Kannur and Calicut.  The nearest railway station is at Kozhikode.

References

Villages in Kozhikode district
Thamarassery area